Juan Rege Corvalán (1787–1830) was an Argentine politician and military man.  He was governor of the province of Mendoza and leader of the Federalist Party.

1787 births
Governors of Mendoza Province
Argentine murder victims
People from Mendoza Province
1830 deaths